Dead End Stories is the debut album from punk rock band One Man Army, released in 1998 through Adeline Records.

Track listing
 "Another Dead End Story" - 2:38
 "Money In the Bank" - 2:52
 "They'll Never Call It Quits" - 3:19
 "One In the Same" - 2:11
 "Stuck In the Avenues" - 3:49
 "Another Time" - 3:36
 "Fate At Fourteen" - 3:19
 "Down the Block" - 2:53
 "Big Time" - 3:05
 "Three Strikes" - 2:42
 "Back Then" - 2:34
 "Downtown Lights" (Bonus) - 3:33

References

Adeline Records albums
One Man Army (band) albums
1998 albums